The Judo Grand Slam tournaments are international judo tournaments held by the International Judo Federation as part of the IJF World Tour.

After the Olympic Games, World Championships and World Masters, the Grand Slam tournaments are the highest-ranking worldwide judo tournaments, i.e. the tournaments in which the judoka can acquire the most ranking points.

While some sources states that the first Grand Slam tournament was held in Tokyo in December 2008, the IJF titled it as "Kano Cup", not "Grand Slam". In 2009 additional tournaments were also held in Paris, Moscow and Rio de Janeiro. In 2013, Baku replaced Rio de Janeiro. Until 2013 there were four Grand Slam tournaments every year. In 2014 it was decided that a fifth tournament would be added which would be held in Abu Dhabi. In 2019 two additional tournaments were added.

9 Grand Slam tournaments are planned for 2022.

Grand Slam tournaments

The locations where the tournaments are held in 2022:

Other locations where the tournaments were held in the past:

List of top medal winners 
List updated to 18 October 2022.

Number of medals won by each country

World Ranking List Points
As in any IJF World Tour tournament, athletes earn WRL points by competing in IJF Grand Slam events. Points are awarded based on judoka placement in the competition.

References

 
Grand Slam
Grand Slam